Wilkowo-Gaj is a settlement in the administrative district of Gmina Lipno, within Leszno County, Greater Poland Voivodeship, in west-central Poland.

References

Wilkowo-Gaj